Vettori is an Italian surname that may refer to
 Daniel Vettori (born 1979), New Zealand cricketer
 Ernst Vettori (born 1964), Austrian ski jumper
 Francesco Vettori (1474–1539), correspondent of Niccolò Machiavelli
Luca Vettori (born 1991), Italian volleyball player
Marvin Vettori (born 1993), Italian mixed martial artist
 Piero Vettori (1499–1585), also known as Petrus Victorius, an Italian classical scholar known for his publication of Ancient Greek texts
 Vittorio Vettori (1920–2004), Italian poet

Italian-language surnames